This is a list of websites used for online chat.

See also
Chat room

References

Chat